The , known from 2010 to February 2015 as , and before that as  is a multi-purpose stadium in Okayama, Japan. It is currently used mostly for football matches and athletics events. It is the home field of Fagiano Okayama, and used for some rugby union Top League games.
The stadium's capacity is 20,000 people.
Before the naming rights were acquired by Kanko and then City Light, the venue's nickname was ".

References

External links 

J. League stadium guide 

Athletics (track and field) venues in Japan
Football venues in Japan
Rugby union stadiums in Japan
Sport in Okayama
Multi-purpose stadiums in Japan
Fagiano Okayama
Sports venues in Okayama Prefecture
Sports venues completed in 1957
1957 establishments in Japan